AS Roniu is an association football club in Tahiti. They play in the Tahiti First Division. They play home games at Stade Pater Te Hono Nui.

References

External links
Soccerway Profile

Football clubs in Tahiti
Football clubs in French Polynesia